Rocketmen is a 2009 documentary directed and written by Richard Dale.  The film is narrated by Michael J. Reynolds.

This was BBC Worldwide's first science film release and it grossed $1.2 million from being shown theatrically on 104 screens in Japan in 2009 (performing  at number 16 nationally on its opening weekend), in addition to subsequent release on various international television outlets and on Netflix.

Synopsis 
Using archival footage, this film explores the American space program, from the Mercury program through Gemini program through the return to space after the Space Shuttle Columbia Disaster.

References

External links 
 
 

2009 films
2009 documentary films
Documentary films about the space program of the United States
British documentary films
2000s English-language films
2000s British films
English-language documentary films